Thulani Malinga (born 11 December 1955) is a South African former professional boxer who competed from 1981 to 2000, and held the WBC super-middleweight title twice between 1996 and 1998.

Professional career
Known as "Sugar Boy", Malinga turned pro in 1981 after compiling an amateur record of 185–10, beginning his career with a first-round stoppage of Victor Zulu on 8 August 1981. Malinga held several championship titles during a twenty-year career as a middleweight, super middleweight and light heavyweight, fighting memorable bouts against Nigel Benn, Chris Eubank and Roy Jones Jr., among others.

In 1989 he got his first shot at a title, taking on undefeated IBF super middleweight title holder Graciano Rocchigiani. Malinga lost a decision, and the next year took on Lindell Holmes, again for the IBF super middleweight title. He again lost via decision, and in 1992 got a shot at the WBO super middleweight title against Chris Eubank, during which Malinga was dropped in the fifth round and lost a close decision. Three months later he was also to lose a close decision—by just half a point—against Nigel Benn. After many fights in his native South Africa, and a further KO loss to Roy Jones Jr. in the U.S., he landed another shot at the title in March 1996 against Benn, who was now the WBC super middleweight champion. Despite suffering a knockdown, Malinga scored an upset against Benn to win the title, but ended up losing the title in his first defense against Vincenzo Nardiello. He regained the title in his next fight, a decision win over Robin Reid (who had defeated Nardiello in his first defense of the title). However, he would again lose the belt in his first defense against Richie Woodhall, via decision. He fought four more times, retiring after a suffering an eighth-round TKO against Ole Klemetsen on 14 January 2000, finishing his career with 44 wins (20 by KO) and 13 losses.  His trainer was Nick Durandt.

Professional boxing record

References

External links

1955 births
People from Ladysmith, KwaZulu-Natal
Living people
World super-middleweight boxing champions
South African male boxers
Light-heavyweight boxers
African Boxing Union champions
World Boxing Council champions